John Durbin is an American actor. He is best known for playing Gul Lemec in the Star Trek: The Next Generation 2-part episode "Chain of Command".

Filmography 
 Take Out (2005) ... as Hershel Kammer
 Sabrina, the Teenage Witch
 episode I Fall to Pieces ... as Ed
 Angel
 episode Quickening ... as Dr. Fetvanovich
 The Breed (2001) ... as Boudreaux
 Star Trek: Voyager
 episode Critical Care ... as Alien Miner
 The Huntress
 episode Scattered ... as Thin Man
 Tully (2000) ... as Marshall
 Providence
 episode The Kiss ... as Shopkeeper
 Ride with the Devil (1999) ... as Skaggs
 Dead Dogs (1999) ... as Gordon
 A Will of Their Own (1998) ... as Sweatshop Foreman
 Executive Power (1997) ... as Mr. Shank
 The Shining ... as Horace 'Harry' Derwent
 A Deadly Vision (1997) ... as Music store clerk
 Star Trek: Deep Space Nine
 episode A Simple Investigation ... as Traidy
 Kansas City (1996) ... as Gas Station Attendant
 Gone in the Night (1996) ... as Psychic
 Melrose Place
 episode Dial M for Melrose ... as Mark Paul
 episode Let the Games Begin ... as Mark Paul
 Truman (1995) ... as Producer
 Witch Hunt (1994) ... as Brackett
 Mr. Jones (1993) ... as Patient
 And the Band Played On (1993) ... as 6th Man
 King of the Hill (1993) ... as Mr. Sandoz, Artist
 Heart and Souls (1993) ... as Stage Manager
 Perry Mason: The Case of the Telltale Talk Show Host (1993) ... as Armstrong
 I Can Make You Love Me (1993) ... as Lawrence Kane
 Cyborg 2 (1993) ... as Tech #1 - Observation Room
 Star Trek: The Next Generation
 episode Chain of Command: Part 2 ... as Gul Lemec
 episode Chain of Command: Part 1 ... as Gul Lemec
 episode Lonely Among Us ... as Ssestar
 The Burden of Proof (1992) ... as Remo
 O Pioneers! (1992) ... as Father Duchesne
 Dollman (1991) ... as Fisher
 The Killing Mind (1991)
 Ain't No Way Back (1990) ... as Zebediah Campbell
 Checking Out (1989) ... as Spencer Gillinger
 Mutant on the Bounty (1989) ... as Manny
 Brothers in Arms (1989) ... as Henry
 Dr. Caligari (1989) ... as Gus Pratt
 Dead Solid Perfect (1988) ... as Man
 Tricks of the Trade (1988) 
 Demonwarp (1988) ... as Minister
 Dead Man Walking (1988) ... as Bartender
 Tapeheads (1988) ... as Hitman #3
 Max Headroom
 episode Lessons ... as Dragul
 The Blue Iguana ... as Louie Sparks
 Hooperman episode Aria da Capo
 Number One with a Bullet ... as Transvestite
 Crime Story episode The Pinnacle ... as Accountant
 Hunter episode The Contract ... as Kirschbaum
 The A-Team episode Firing Line
 episode Dishpan Man ... as Ramon Soulay
 Annihilator (1986) ... as Trucker
 Moonlighting episode North by North DiPesto
 The Return of the Living Dead'' ... as Radio Corpse #1

References

External links 
 

Year of birth missing (living people)
Living people
American male film actors
American male television actors
People from Council Bluffs, Iowa
20th-century American male actors